Smyrna is an unincorporated community in Salt Creek Township, Decatur County, Indiana.

History
The first post office at Smyrna was established in 1846. It was named after the ancient city of Smyrna.

Geography

References

Unincorporated communities in Decatur County, Indiana
Unincorporated communities in Indiana